The following lists events that happened in 2008 in Iceland.

Incumbents
President – Ólafur Ragnar Grímsson 
Prime Minister – Geir Haarde

Events

May
 May 29 - A strong earthquake measuring 6.1 on the Richter scale strikes Iceland near the town of Selfoss.

September
 September 29 - The government of Iceland takes control of the country's number three bank, the struggling Glitnir Bank.

October
 October 7 - Subprime mortgage crisis
 Russia agrees to provide Iceland with emergency loans of 4 billion euros ($5.4 billion).
 Iceland's Financial Supervisory Authority takes control of troubled Landsbanki Bank.
 October 9 - Kaupthing Bank, Iceland's largest bank, is nationalized by the country's Financial Supervisory Authority.
 October 21 - Iceland's Kaupthing Bank fails to pay interest to its 50-billion-yen (US$493 million) bondholders in Japan.
 October 29 - Danish-based low-cost carrier Sterling Airlines files for bankruptcy and stops all passenger flights after its cash-strapped Icelandic investors were unable keep the company afloat.

November
 November 19 - The International Monetary Fund approves a US$2.1 billion rescue package for Iceland following its financial crisis.

 
2000s in Iceland
Iceland
Iceland
Years of the 21st century in Iceland